Neil Gordon Munro (1863–1942) was a Scottish physician and anthropologist. Resident in Japan for almost fifty years, he was notable as an early archaeologist and one of the first Westerners to study the Ainu people of Hokkaido.

Biography
Educated in the University of Edinburgh Medical School M.B., C.M. 1888 and M.D. 1909, he traveled in India before settling in Yokohama as director of Yokohama Juzen Hospital which was one of the largest western-style hospitals in Asia in 1893. From 1930 until his death he lived among the Ainu in Nibutani village in Hokkaido. Film footage he took of the local people survives. 

Between 1908 and 1914 he sent more than 2,000 objects (including archaeological ceramics, metalwork, shells, bones and stone tools; musical instruments, Buddhist objects and Ainu material) to the Royal Scottish Museum (today's National Museum of Scotland) in Edinburgh. He authored several volumes, among them Coins of Japan (1904), Prehistoric Japan (1908), and Ainu Creed and Cult (with H Watanabe & B Z Seligman, 1962).

Books 
 Coins of Japan (1904) 
 Prehistoric Japan (1908)

External links

1863 births
1942 deaths
19th-century Scottish medical doctors
20th-century Scottish medical doctors
Scottish anthropologists
Medical doctors from Edinburgh
Scottish collectors
Scottish archaeologists
Scottish numismatists
Historians of Japan
Scottish expatriates in Japan
Naturalized citizens of Japan
Alumni of the University of Edinburgh
Scientists from Edinburgh
20th-century Scottish historians